St Cuthbert's Church is in the village of Over Kellet, Lancashire, England. It is an active Anglican parish church in the deanery of Tunstall, the archdeaconry of Lancaster, and the diocese of Blackburn. The church is recorded in the National Heritage List for England as a designated Grade II* listed building.

History

The earliest surviving parts of the church date from about 1200, but most of the structure is from the 16th century. It was restored in 1863–64 by the Lancaster architect E. G. Paley.  During the restoration, the ceiling was removed, the chancel arch was reinstated, the east end was rebuilt, and the seating was increased from 260 to 295. The alterations cost £330.  It was further restored in 1909 by the successors in Paley's practice, Austin and Paley; this included rebuilding of the eastern bay, and the addition of dormers.

Architecture

Exterior
The church is constructed in pebbledashed rubble with sandstone dressings, and has slate roofs. Its architectural style is mainly late Perpendicular.  The plan consists of a four-bay nave with a north porch, north and south aisles, a chancel, and a west tower. In the angle between the tower and the north aisle is a vestry. The tower has diagonal buttresses, and a battlemented parapet. It contains a west doorway, now blocked, a three-light west window, and three-light bell openings on all sides. Along the north aisles are three-light windows, and the vestry contains a two-light window. Along the south aisle are four two-light windows. The east window has three lights containing Perpendicular tracery.

Interior
Inside the church the arcades are carried on octagonal piers. There are box pews in the nave and the aisles. At the west end of the south aisle are the Royal arms of George III. The font in the north aisle is cylindrical and constructed of gritstone. There is another font in the south aisle dating from the 19th century. Also in the church are monuments dating from the 18th and 19th centuries.  The stained glass in the east window was installed in 1868.

External features
The churchyard contains the war graves of a soldier of World War I, and a Royal Air Force officer of World War II.

See also

Grade II* listed buildings in Lancashire
Listed buildings in Over Kellet
List of ecclesiastical works by E. G. Paley
List of ecclesiastical works by Austin and Paley (1895–1914)

References
Citations

Sources

 

Over Kellet
Over Kellet
Over Kellet
Over Kellet
Over Kellet
Over Kellet
Church buildings by E. G. Paley
Austin and Paley buildings
Churches in the City of Lancaster